Basepoint may refer to a point singled out in a:
 Pointed set, or in a
 Pointed space

See also
Origin (mathematics)